The 2023 ACC women's basketball tournament concluded the 2022-23 season of the Atlantic Coast Conference, and was held at the Greensboro Coliseum in Greensboro, North Carolina, from March 1–5, 2023. The 2023 edition marked the 23rd time in 24 years that the tournament was held in Greensboro. The winner received the ACC's automatic bid to the 2023 NCAA Division I Women's Basketball Tournament.

Seeds

All 15 ACC teams participated in the tournament. Teams were seeded by record within the conference, with a tiebreaker system to seed teams with identical conference records. The top four seeds received double byes, while seeds 5 through 9 received single byes. Seedings were finalized on February 26, 2023, after the final day of regular season play, with Notre Dame finishing in first place and earning the top seed.

Schedule

Bracket

Source:

* – Denotes overtime period

Game summaries

First round

Second round

Quarterfinals

Semifinals

Final

All-Tournament Teams

See also 
 2023 ACC men's basketball tournament

References 

ACC women's basketball tournament
Basketball competitions in Greensboro, North Carolina
ACC Women's Basketball
College sports tournaments in North Carolina
Women's sports in North Carolina